Arcilasisa is a monotypic moth genus of the family Noctuidae. Its only species, Arcilasisa sobria, is found in southern India. Both the genus and species were first described by Francis Walker in 1865.

Description
Its eyes are minutely pubescent. The proboscis is well developed. Palpi obliquely porrect (extending forward) with somewhat long hair below. Thorax and abdomen tuftless. Legs spineless.

References

Acronictinae